

Major events
The administrative reform of 1727 was carried out soon after Peter the Great's death, when it became apparent that previous reform was not working as planned. The fast pace of the reforms came into contradiction with the traditional ways of doing things. Newly created bureaucracy required significant financial investments, which the government was lacking. Neither Catherine I, Peter I's second wife and successor, nor her government were willing to go on with the reforms in their original form. As a result, the 1727 reform became a step back, abolishing the system of districts and restoring the old system of uezds (уе́зды) instead. A total of 166 uyezds were re-established, and with the newly created uyezds the Russian Empire had approximately 250 uyezds.

1727—new Belgorod Governorate was formed from Belgorod, Oryol, and Sevsk Provinces (провинции) of Kiev Governorate.
1727—new Novgorod Governorate was formed from Belozersk, Novgorod, Pskov, Tver, and Velikiye Luki Provinces of the St. Petersburg Governorate.
1727—Uglich and Yaroslavl Provinces of the St. Petersburg Governorate were transferred to Moscow Governorate.
1727—Narva Province of St. Petersburg Governorate was transferred to Revel Governorate.
1727—Solikamsk and Vyatka Provinces of Siberian Governorate were transferred to Kazan Governorate.

Subdivisions (as of 1727)
Archangelgorod Governorate (Архангелогородская губерния)
subdivided into 4 provinces:
Archangelgorod Province (Архангелогородская провинция)
Galich Province (Галицкая провинция)
Ustyug Province (Устюжская провинция)
Vologda Province (Вологодская провинция)
Astrakhan Governorate (Астраханская губерния)
was considered subdivided into 1 province
Belgorod Governorate (Белгородская губерния)
subdivided into 3 provinces:
Belgorod Province (Белгородская провинция)
Oryol Province (Орловская провинция)
Sevsk Province (Севская провинция)
Kazan Governorate (Казанская губерния)
subdivided into 6 provinces:
Kazan Province (Казанская провинция)
Penza Province (Пензенская провинция)
Solikamsk Province (Соликамская провинция)
Sviyaga Province (Свияжская провинция)
Ufa Province (Уфимская провинция)
Vyatka Province (Вятская провинция)
Kiev Governorate (Киевская губерния)
was considered subdivided into 1 province (with 12 regiments in Little Russia)
Moscow Governorate (Московская губерния)
subdivided into 11 provinces:
Kaluga Province (Калужская провинция)
Kostroma Province (Костромская провинция)
Moscow Province (Московская провинция)
Pereyaslavl-Ryazan Province (Переяславль-Рязанская провинция)
Pereyaslavl-Zalessk Province (Переяславско-Залесская провинция)
Suzdal Province (Суздальская провинция)
Tula Province (Тульская провинция)
Uglich Province (Угличская провинция)
Vladimir Province (Владимирская провинция)
Yaroslavl Province (Ярославская провинция)
Yuryev Province (Юрьевская провинция)
Nizhny Novgorod Governorate (Нижегородская губерния)
subdivided into 3 provinces:
Alatyr Province (Алатырская провинция)
Arzamas Province (Арзамасская провинция)
Nizhny Novgorod Province (Нижегородская провинция)
Novgorod Governorate (Новгородская губерния)
subdivided into 5 provinces:
Belozersk Province (Белозерская провинция)
Novgorod Province (Новгородская провинция)
Pskov Province (Псковская провинция)
Tver Province (Тверская провинция)
Velikiye Luki Province (Великолуцкая провинция)
Revel Governorate (Ревельская губерния)
was considered subdivided into 1 province (Estland)
Riga Governorate (Рижская губерния)
was considered subdivided into 1 province (Livland)
St. Petersburg Governorate (Санкт-Петербургская губерния)
subdivided into 2 provinces:
Petersburg Province (Петербургская провинция)
Vyborg Province (Выборгская провинция)
Siberian Governorate (Сибирская губерния)
subdivided into 3 provinces:
Irkutsk Province (Иркутская провинция)
Tobolsk Province (Тобольская провинция)
Yenisei Province (Енисейская провинция)
Smolensk Governorate (Смоленская губерния)
was considered subdivided into 1 province
Voronezh Governorate (Воронежская губерния)
subdivided into 5 provinces:
Bakhmut Province (Бахмутская провинция)
Shatsk Province (Шацкая провинция)
Tambov Province (Тамбовская провинция)
Voronezh Province (Воронежская провинция)
Yeletsk Province (Елецкая провинция)

References
Ю. Готье. "История областного управления в России от Петра I до Екатерины II". Том I. "Реформа 1727 года. Областное деление и областные учреждения 1727-1775 гг.". Издание Императорского общества Истории и Древностей Российских при Московском университете. Москва, 1913.

1727-1728
1720s in Russia